|}

The Weld Park Stakes is a Group 3 flat horse race in Ireland open to two-year-old thoroughbred fillies. It is run at the Curragh over a distance of 7 furlongs (1,408 metres), and it is scheduled to take place each year in September or October.

History
The event was originally held at Phoenix Park, and it used to be contested over a mile. For a period it was called the Wexford Stakes, and it was later renamed the Park Stakes. It was shortened to 7 furlongs in 1971.

The trainer Dermot Weld started to sponsor the race in the 1980s, and it was subsequently run in memory of his father Charlie Weld (also a trainer). The C. L. Weld Park Stakes was transferred to the Curragh in 1991. In 2014 the name of Dermot Weld's mother, Marguerite, was added to the race title and it became the C. L. & M. F. Weld Park Stakes. Since 2018 it has been run as the Weld Park Stakes.

Notable winners of the race have included Ridgewood Pearl, Alborada, Imagine and Qualify.

Records
Leading jockey since 1965 (7 wins):
 Michael Kinane – Lone Bidder (1980), Countess Candy (1982), Gaily Gaily (1985), Trusted Partner (1987), Asema (1992), Arch Swing (2006), Eva's Request (2007)

Leading trainer since 1965 (7 wins):
 John Oxx – Isle of Glass (1990), Tarwiya (1991), Morcote (1993), Ridgewood Pearl (1994), Rafayda (1998), Arch Swing (2006), My Titania (2013)

Winners since 1980

Earlier winners

 1965: Crystal Light *
 1966: Graunuaile
 1967: Windy Gay
 1968: Another Daughter
 1969: Royal Words
 1970: Three Roses
 1971: Al-Burak
 1972: Fiery Diplomat
 1973: Silk Buds
 1974: Small World
 1975: Capricious
 1976: All Serene
 1977: Turkish Treasure
 1978: Solar
 1979: Mulvilla

* Moon Dancer finished first in 1965, but she was disqualified.

See also
 Horse racing in Ireland
 List of Irish flat horse races

References
 Racing Post:

 galopp-sieger.de – C. L. Weld Stakes.
 horseracingintfed.com – International Federation of Horseracing Authorities – C. L. Weld Park Stakes (2018).
 irishracinggreats.com – C. L. Weld Park Stakes (Group 3).
 pedigreequery.com – C. L. Weld Park Stakes – Curragh.

Flat races in Ireland
Curragh Racecourse
Flat horse races for two-year-old fillies